The 2016 United States presidential election in Alabama was held on Tuesday, November 8, 2016, as part of the 2016 United States presidential election in which all 50 states plus the District of Columbia participated. Alabama voters chose electors to represent them in the Electoral College via a popular vote, pitting the Republican Party's nominee, businessman Donald Trump, and running mate Indiana Governor Mike Pence against Democratic Party nominee, former Secretary of State Hillary Clinton, and her running mate Virginia Senator Tim Kaine. Alabama has nine electoral votes in the Electoral College.

Alabama has voted for the Republican candidate in every election since it was won by Ronald Reagan in 1980. As such, Trump was heavily favored to win the state. On the day of the election, Trump won the election in Alabama with 62.08% of the vote, while Clinton received 34.36% of the vote. The state had given 60.55% of its votes to Republican nominee Mitt Romney in 2012, meaning that it had shifted 1.53% more Republican from the previous election. Trump's margin of victory in Alabama was 27.72%, a 5.53% increase from Romney's 22.19% margin of victory. This makes it the largest loss by a Democrat since Democratic nominee George McGovern in 1972. On the other hand, Trump became the first Republican to win the White House without carrying Jefferson County since Richard Nixon in 1968.

Primary elections

Democratic primary

Opinion polling

Results

Republican primary

General election

Predictions 
The following are final 2016 predictions from various organizations for Alabama as of Election Day.

Statewide results

Results by county

Counties that flipped from Democratic to Republican
Barbour (largest city: Eufaula)
Conecuh (largest city: Evergreen)

By congressional district
Trump won 6 of 7 congressional districts

Turnout
According to the Alabama Secretary of State website, voter turnout was 66.82% with 2,137,482 ballots cast out of 3,198,703 registered voters.

Opinion polls

Electors
Alabama had 9 electors in 2016 all of them voted for Donald Trump for president and Mike Pence for vice president.

The electors were:
Frank Burt Jr.
Will Sellers
James Eldon Wilson
Tim Wadsworth
J. Elbert Peters
Mary Sue McClurkin
Robert A. Cusanelli
Perry O. Hooper Jr.
Grady H. Thornton

See also

 2016 Democratic Party presidential debates and forums
 2016 Democratic Party presidential primaries
 2016 Republican Party presidential debates and forums
 2016 Republican Party presidential primaries
 United States presidential elections in Alabama

References

External links
 RNC 2016 Republican Nominating Process 
 Green papers for 2016 primaries, caucuses, and conventions
 Decision Desk Headquarter Results for Alabama
 

AL
2016
Presidential